Sadlon Arena (formerly known as the Barrie Molson Centre) is a 4,195-seat multi-purpose arena in Barrie, Ontario, Canada. It is primarily home to the Barrie Colts of the Ontario Hockey League. It is located in the south end of the city on Bayview Drive at Mapleview Drive, near Park Place and big box shopping plazas.

The arena hosted its first OHL game on December 31, 1995, when the Barrie Colts hosted the Sudbury Wolves. The Colts played the first half of their inaugural season at the old Dunlop Arena while the BMC was under construction. It is the former home of the Barrie Lakeshores of Major Series Lacrosse. The Molson Centre hosted the 2013 The Dominion Tankard, the provincial curling championship.

The naming agreement for the Barrie Molson Centre ended on December 31, 2018. As a result, the City of Barrie placed an interim sign on the arena with the initials BMC until a new sponsor was found. On November 26, 2019, the city announced that a new, 10-year naming rights agreement with Paul Sadlon Motors (a local auto dealership) had been approved that will change the name of the facility to "Sadlon Arena".

References

External links

The OHL Arena & Travel Guide - Barrie Molson Centre

Buildings and structures in Barrie
Indoor arenas in Ontario
Indoor ice hockey venues in Canada
Indoor lacrosse venues in Canada
Ontario Hockey League arenas
Sport in Barrie
Sports venues in Ontario